Jean-Philippe Saïko (born 20 August 1990) is a New Caledonian professional footballer who plays as a forward for New Caledonia Super Ligue club AS Magenta and the New Caledonia national team.

International career

International goals
Scores and results list New Caledonia's goal tally first.

External links
 
 

1990 births
Living people
New Caledonian footballers
Association football forwards
AS Magenta players
Gaïtcha FCN players
Vendée Poiré-sur-Vie Football players
Stade Poitevin FC players
Limoges FC players
Tasman United players
AS Lössi players
2016 OFC Nations Cup players
New Caledonia international footballers
Championnat National 3 players
New Zealand Football Championship players
French expatriate footballers
New Caledonian expatriate footballers
Expatriate association footballers in New Zealand
French expatriate sportspeople in New Zealand
New Caledonian expatriate sportspeople in New Zealand